The 2014 Indore Open ATP Challenger was a professional tennis tournament played on outdoor hard courts. It was the first and only edition of the tournament for the men. It was part of the 2014 ATP Challenger Tour. It took place in Indore, India, on 13 October to 18 October 2014.

Singles main draw entrants

Seeds 

 1 Rankings as of 6 October 2014

Other entrants 
The following players received wildcards into the singles main draw:
  Sidharth Rawat
  Vishnu Vardhan
  Sasikumar Mukund
  Ronit Singh Bisht

The following players received entry from the qualifying draw:
  Vijay Sundar Prashanth
  Lakshit Sood
  Riccardo Ghedin
  Ranjeet Virali-Murugesan

Champions

Singles 

  Saketh Myneni def.  Aleksandr Nedovyesov, 6–3, 6–7(4–7), 6–3

Doubles 

  Adrián Menéndez-Maceiras /  Aleksandr Nedovyesov def.  Yuki Bhambri /  Divij Sharan, 2–6, 6–4, [10–3]

External links 
 Results

Indore Open ATP Challenger
Indore Open ATP Challenger
Indore Open ATP Challenger
2014 in Indian tennis